The Free Sons of Israel, is a fraternal organization that was established in 1849 to aid Jewish refugees from the Revolutions of 1848.

Grandmasters
 Marcus Krauskopf, rabbi of Congregation Shearith Israel
 Leon Cohen (1963).
 Harry Rabinowitz of Shenorock, New York (1960).

External links
 Free Sons of Israel

References

Ethnic fraternal orders in the United States
Organizations established in 1849